KXXM (96.1 FM, "96.1 NOW") is a Top 40 (CHR) station based in San Antonio, Texas, owned by iHeartMedia, Inc. Its studios are located in the Stone Oak neighborhood in Far North San Antonio, and the transmitter site is in Frederich Wilderness Park on the city's northwest side.

History
On May 5, 1964, KMFM signed on 96.1 MHz. It was a classical music station owned by the Pennington family, broadcasting from studios at 134 E. Agarita Ave.

In 1976, Harry Pennington, Jr. died, and his wife Rosa Lee took over the station before selling it to Classic Media in 1977. Classic built a new, 100 kW facility for the station. Six years later, the station was sold to C&W Wireless, which programmed a Contemporary Christian format known as "Son Light Radio FM 96" and changed the callsign to KSLR to match the new moniker.

Inner City Broadcasting, which already owned KSJL 760 AM, bought KSLR in 1986. The two stations began simulcasting as Super Q 96 FM and Super Q 76 AM, with the callsign changed to KSAQ on the FM side. In 1988, the simulcast was split, with 96.1 FM becoming known by the short name Q96 FM. During this time, a long segment of news known as "Cruz News" aired weekday mornings at 7 on Q96.

At midnight on February 3, 1991, the format was changed to album-oriented rock under the 96 Rock name. The station filled the void left by KISS-FM's flip from AOR to oldies the previous year. It was the only FM rock station in San Antonio until KISS reverted to rock format at the end of 1991.

In 1993, Inner City sold 760 AM to Clear Channel Communications and moved its format of Urban Adult Contemporary music to 96.1 FM, with the station changing its calls to KSJL-FM. Unlike KSJL at 760 AM, the new KSJL-FM did not use "The Touch" format from Satellite Music Networks, and it added more mainstream Urban Contemporary tracks as well as "The Mix Show" with Ricco and D-Street, which would air Monday-Saturdays from 7-10p.m.

In 1998, another series of shuffles occurred when Inner City sold KSJL-FM to Clear Channel for $10 million. The Mix show was dropped on July 4 of that year, and the station reverted to a more adult-based Urban Contemporary format. The format was simulcast on a leased station, 810 AM KCHG, which would soon change its calls to KSJL itself. In addition, KTXX-FM, a rimshot located in Devine, Texas, increased its power to reach San Antonio proper, becoming KSJL-FM.

All this movement made way for a new format on 96.1. At 5 p.m. on September 3, 1998, Mix 96.1 debuted, and shortly after the callsign changed to KXXM. The first song aired was "The Way" by Fastball. KXXM would play artists like Will Smith, Jewel, Nsync, Backstreet Boys, Britney Spears and other Adult Top 40 artists.

On June 30, 2017 at 5p.m., after playing "Be the One" by Dua Lipa, the station rebranded as "96.1 NOW", launching commercial free through the July 4th weekend. The first song on "NOW" was "I'm the One" by DJ Khaled and Justin Bieber.

KXXM-HD2
KXXM-HD2 broadcasts the former "Mix" brand that originally aired on 96.1 from 1998 to 2017.

References

External links

XXM
Contemporary hit radio stations in the United States
Radio stations established in 1964
1964 establishments in Texas
IHeartMedia radio stations